Vandae Maatharam is a 2010 Indian action film directed by T. Aravind. The film features Mammootty & Arjun  in the lead roles, along with Sneha, Deepak Jethi, Shraddha Arya, Rajkapoor, Nassar, Jai Akash, Jagadish and Rajan P. Dev in supporting roles. The film was simultaneously made and released in Malayalam and Tamil. The story revolves around the investigation and how two police officers, played by Mammootty and Arjun, eradicate the terrorists from entering the border. The film was released overseas on 10 September 2010 and later in India on 17 September 2010.

Plot
In a high-level meeting, top government officials analyze farmers' struggle and related social violence to put forward an amicable solution to have lasting harmony. Their plans are threatened by the terrorists' infiltrations. Anandharaman IPS (Mohan Sharma), Director IB, forms a task force to handle the imminent threat. Gopikrishnan IPS (Mammootty), Deputy Director IB, leads the anti-terror operation in the south zone. He recruits SSP Anwar Hussain IPS (Arjun Sarja) to lead the task force and interrogations. Nandini (Sneha), an aviator, is Gopi's wife, and they are sad that they do not have a child. IB gets information from RAW, the foreign intelligence agency, that a terrorist code named Malik has infiltrated the country via sea border and has already killed a man in the process. A peculiar taqiyah obtained from the crime scene leads them to Sheikh Muhammad (Raj Kapoor), a local heavyweight who leads them to Balan (Riyaz Khan), a man who deals in ship breaking. Balan, on interrogation, reveals that Dr. Nayeem (Jayaprakash) of the Metro Hospitals is their handler, and he is in contact with the terror command. When the team proceeds to arrest Nayeem, he commits suicide. Nayeem's mobile phone leads them to Malik. The IB command center intercepts the call between Malik and his terrorist leader and cracks their plans to communicate via migratory birds. Following the information, Gopi, Anwar, and the team catch Malik. A series of tortures do not break Malik and fail to open him up or reveal any of his plans. Gopi finds a video of Malik showing his little daughter Kurshid. With this video background, they make changes in Malik's face and try to make him believe that he has been in a coma for 20 years. Since the IB agent who is supposed to play the role of Kurshid was KIA during another mission, Gopi decides to send Nandini (who is now pregnant) as Kurshid, to get Malik's emotional with sentiments and thus making him to speak out his plans. But Malik finds out this trap and kills Nandini and escapes, thus making Gopi furious. Finally, Gopi and Anwar catch Malik before he could execute his plans, and Gopi kills Malik in an encounter.

Cast

 Mammootty as DIG Gopikrishnan IPS aka GK, Deputy Director IB
 Arjun as SP Anwar Hussain IPS, an officer who assists GK in the mission (Voice dubbed by Shobi Thilakan in the Malayalam version)
 Sneha as Nandini Gopikrishnan
 Deepak Jethi as Malik
 Mukthar Khan as Terrorist Leader
 Nassar as Prime Minister
 Jagadish as Sheshadri, IB officer
 Jai Akash as Ashok, police officer
 Vijayakumar as SP
 Mohan Sharma as Anadharaman IPS, Director IB
 Rajan P. Dev as Dy. SP Mansoor
 Rajkapoor as Sheikh Muhammad
 Riyaz Khan as Balan
 Jayaprakash as Dr. Nayeem
 Rachana Mourya (Special appearance)
 Daisy Shah (Special appearance)

Production
The shooting started by the middle of 2007 and was finished by feb 2009 and later on the story was modified due to some personal problems. The film was started with Karthi as the director, but after the first schedule the producer Henry, who also wrote the script, replaced him with debutante T. Aravind. The film was shot at locations in Kochi, Chennai, Marthandam and Thengapattanam. It took 100 days of shooting and ten schedules to complete the film. The Tamil version was initially titled Aruvadi but was later changed to Vandae Maatharam too. The audio launch was held on 3 July 2010 and the movie was all set to release on the eve of Ramzan, 10 September 2010 in both Tamil and Malayalam. But at the last moment, it couldn't make it to the theatres. Then, it was released on 17 September 2010.

Amitabh Bachchan was approached to do a pivotal role in the movie, but as he was not able to allocate the call sheets, Nassar played the role. Two heroines were signed, Sneha was paired with Mammootty and played the role of a pilot, the other heroine Shraddha Arya was paired with Arjun and played the role of an ornithologist. However, Shraddha Arya's role was dropped. In 2007, A. R. Rahman was approached to score the music of the film. But during that time, he was busy with the composing work of Jodhaa Akbar. Vidyasagar was reported to compose five songs; but at the end it turned out that D. Imman was the composer. Stunts director for the film was the renowned stunt director Allan Amin.

Reception

Sify and Nowrunnig give the film 2/5 saying, "The done to death patriotic theme receives no fresh makeover in the film. If only it had paid more attention to that feeble script instead of raking up all that clatter and clamor on screen, would it have made more sense".

Soundtrack
The soundtrack features six songs composed by D. Imman, with lyrics penned by Mankombu Gopalakrishnan and Vayalar Sarath Chandra Varma for the Malayalam version and Vairamuthu, Snehan, Nandalala and Viveka for the Tamil version. The albums were released on 3 July 2010. A patriotic song penned by Vairamuthu was rendered by ten singers: D. Imman, Harish Raghavendra, Vijay Yesudas, Haricharan, Naresh Iyer, Krish, Pop Shalini, Mathangi, Srilekha Parthasarathy and Chinmayi.

References

External links
 
 "Vande Matharam in July"
 "Vande Mataram from July 15"
 http://www.nowrunning.com/movie/4057/malayalam/vande-matharam/index.htm
 http://popcorn.oneindia.in/title/1429/vandematharam.html
 http://popcorn.oneindia.in/title/1492/vande-mataram.html
 sify.com

2010s Malayalam-language films
Indian multilingual films
2010 films
2010s Tamil-language films
Films about terrorism in India
Films scored by D. Imman
Fictional portrayals of the Tamil Nadu Police
2010 multilingual films
2010 directorial debut films